Endotricha capnospila is a species of snout moth in the genus Endotricha. It was described by Edward Meyrick in 1932, and is known from Fiji.

References

Endotrichini
Moths described in 1932